is a Japanese company that operates a chain of fast food restaurants in East Asia, having opened its first restaurant in Tokyo in September 1972. Taking its name from its parent company, Lotte Corporation, it currently has franchises in Japan, South Korea, Indonesia, Vietnam, Cambodia, Laos, and Myanmar. The origin of the name is a combination of corporate names Lotte and Cafeteria.

Its menu includes typical fast-food items such as burgers, french fries, fried chicken, chicken wings and chicken fingers.

History
The company was founded in February 1972 in Tokyo, Japan, by Shin Kyuk-ho, a Korean entrepreneur. Its first franchises opened in Nihonbashi, Ueno and Yokohama in September of that year. In 1979, the brand was established in Seoul, South Korea. Lotteria later spread throughout East Asia adding locations in China, Myanmar, Taiwan and Vietnam.

In February 16, 2023 it was announced all shares of Lotteria would be sold to major Japanese fast food holding company Zensho on April 1, 2023.

Businesses by country

Japan

In Japan, Lotteria's most popular menu items are hamburgers, cheeseburgers and teriyaki burgers. It invented its other popular item, the shrimp burger, in 1977, which has since been copied by McDonald's and MOS Burger in Japan.

In addition, the menu in Japan also includes fresh sandwiches and desserts like crepes, apple pie, shakes and frozen cake-sticks. The premium cheeseburger is the top selling menu item in Japan.

In 2005, Genichi Tamatsuka, the former president of Fast Retailing Co. (which operates the Uniqlo brand), was appointed as chairman and CEO during a management restructuring in 2005. The appointment was the result of a previous contract undertaken by Revamp Corp, a business revitalization company.

South Korea

Lotteria South Korea was founded in 1979, as part of an expansion of the Lotte Group which also included Lotte Chilsung Beverages, Lotte Food and Lotte Ham. Lotteria became the number-one fast food restaurant chain in South Korea. The company achieved a 45% market share in 2001 (compared to 20.1 percent for McDonald's). Lotteria's success was achieved in part by introducing lines of Koreanized fast food including its now signature kimchi burger, leading to it being seen by most Koreans as a native version of most Western-style fast-food restaurants. The company tries to imitate the western idea of fast food through "cleanliness, bright interior, Western pop music as an audio background," with the idea of trying to create "the impression of a 'small piece of America in the middle of Korea'". Their business strategy resulted in growth rates of 10 percent in 2006 and 16 percent in 2007; by 2009, Lotteria had 920 outlets across the country.

In March 2009, Lotteria took full control of the South Korean branch of T.G.I. Friday's. It had previously invested 10 billion won in the chain in 2002. Lotteria also runs Natuur, one of South Korea's major ice cream franchises, itself introduced to South Korea by Lotte in 1998.

On 27 February 2010, the 'Hamburger Cafeteria' Experience Center was opened in Seoul, KidZania. In April 2016, it will open a "Hamburger Cafeteria" experience center in Busan, KidZania, following KidZania Seoul.

The menu in South Korea includes baked potatoes, sữa chua, salads, cheese sticks, squid rings, and a popular shaved iced dessert called pat bing soo. One of the restaurants most popular burgers is the "Bulgogi Burger" with bulgogi sauce serving as relish. In South Korea too, a specially priced lunchtime menu is offered focusing on less expensive and often reduced items. The timing of the lunch menu differs from store to store but falls within the hours of 11 a.m. and 2 p.m., with prices fluctuating from location to location. There are a few stores which carry weekend lunches but these are relatively rare.

Lotteria is also famous for shrimp burgers. In January 2021, the square shrimp double burger, which was released for a month for limited sales, announced that it would sell it as a regular product due to favorable responses.

China

Lotteria entered the Chinese market in 1994 and mainly centered in Beijing, but it ended operation in 2003 due to a lack of popularity among potential customers. In 2008, Lotteria restarted business in China with new operation strategies that specifically targeting Yanbian Korean Autonomous Region, other stores are located in cities like Beijing, Qingdao, Yantai and Shenyang.

Vietnam
The restaurant entered the Vietnamese market in 2004. Its menu there includes regular menu burgers and fried chicken but not side items like baked potatoes and pat bing soo. They also have an ice cream-based dessert (like a McFlurry) called a Tornado. It comes in five flavors: chocolate, cookie, peanut, sprinkles or green tea.

They also have Shrimp Burgers and some items that include rice, such as drumsticks with rice.

They have a special menu that cannot be found in any other country, which is called "rice and spaghetti".

Indonesia
The chain opened its first Indonesian franchise on 19 October 2011 at Lotte Mart Kelapa Gading, North Jakarta. As of 2015, the chain had 32 outlets in Greater Jakarta, Karawang and Bandung. All outlets in Indonesia were permanently closed on 29 June 2020.

Cambodia
The chain opened its first Cambodian franchise in June 2014 at Aeon Mall, followed by a second store in December 2014 at Soria Mall.

Myanmar

The first Lotteria restaurant in Myanmar was opened in Junction Square in Yangon in April 2013, with plans to open 24 more by 2016 from Yangon to Nay Pyi Taw. Along with the regular fare of chicken and burgers, Lotteria is offering dishes tailored to Myanmar consumers, such as chicken rice.

Laos
The restaurant chain currently has a few stores in the Lao capital Vientiane, as well as a store in the town of Luang Prabang. A new store in Vang Vieng is set to open early 2023.

Other business strategies

In 2003, Lotteria partnered with KT and Intel to provide Wi-Fi access in its restaurants, to help attract more customers. This service has also been available in every restaurant in Japan for NTT Docomo and au mobile users since 2006.

Lotteria has followed the global fast-food trend of shifting towards health-conscious foods and rebranding its image. In the face of health trends, it eliminated trans fats from its French fries. It also introduced healthier menu items, such as a rye bread burger that totals only 350 calories. From 2008, perhaps as a response to McDonald's strategy to become more upmarket, Lotteria began a campaign to change "the image of our stores to create a mood similar to a cafe, geared toward the health-conscious as well as female customers".

Recycling (South Korea only)

Since 2003, the South Korean government has required a 50-to-100 Won deposit to be levied against all disposable cups sold in restaurants to ensure that they were returned to be recycled. As such, products (such as drinks and ice cream) to be consumed in-store are served in reusable plastic containers; or if a customer purchases their product in a disposable cup and pays the deposit, they can have their deposit refunded if they return the empty cup to the counter staff. The recycling law yielded recycling rates for cups of 14 percent in 2003, 22 percent in 2004, and 25 percent in 2005. This law has since been repealed.

The Seoul city government requires mandatory garbage sorting with food, recyclables and general trash to be separated from each other. Specialized receptacles thus exist (for liquids, paper, uneaten food, plastic, and other general waste) at all Lotteria restaurants. In addition, Lotteria also charges a fee of 50-to-100 Won on bags as is the norm for most Western-style stores and other shopping venues in South Korea.

In 2021, Lotteria announced the introduction of drinking lids instead of straws to reduce the use of plastic straws at 100 direct stores.

See also
 List of hamburger restaurants

References

Lotte Corporation subsidiaries
Fast-food hamburger restaurants
Fast-food chains of Japan
Fast-food chains of South Korea
Restaurants established in 1972
Food and drink companies based in Tokyo
Retail companies based in Tokyo
1972 establishments in Japan